The Nodena site is an archeological site east of Wilson, Arkansas, and northeast of Reverie, Tennessee, in Mississippi County, Arkansas, United States. Around 1400–1650 CE an aboriginal palisaded village existed in the Nodena area on a meander bend of the Mississippi River. The Nodena site was discovered and first documented by Dr. James K. Hampson, archaeologist and owner of the plantation on which the Nodena site is located. Artifacts from this site are on display in the Hampson Museum State Park in Wilson, Arkansas. The Nodena site is the type site for the Nodena phase, believed by many archaeologists to be the province of Pacaha visited by Spanish explorer Hernando de Soto in 1542.

In 1964, the Nodena site was declared a National Historic Landmark and in 1966 it was added to the National Register of Historic Places.

Culture of the Nodena people

Nodena is the type site for an important Late Mississippian cultural component, the Nodena phase, which dates from about 1400–1700 CE. The Nodena phase was a collection of villages (see Eaker site) along the Mississippi River between the Missouri Bootheel and Wapanocca Lake. This culture is contemporary with the Menard complex, Tipton phase, Walls phase and the Parkin phase. In the early 1540s, the Spanish Hernando de Soto Expedition is believed to have visited several sites in the Nodena phase, which is usually identified as the Province of Pacaha. The Parkin site is a candidate for the province of Casqui.
Nodena people were part of the Southeastern Ceremonial Complex, an extensive religious and trade network that brought chert, whelk shells, and other exotic goods to the site.

Nodena village 1400–1650 CE

Archaeological artifacts from the villages of the Nodena people are dated to 1400–1650 CE.

The site had three to eight mounds, two of them large substructure mounds. The remains of three structures were found on the mound, one on the top level and two on the terrace level. It had the remains of a  diameter round structure found at its summit. The site also had several large plaza areas, and what Dr. Hampson described as a "chunkey field", which was located directly behind Mound A. A circular mound, designated as "Mound C", was located at the other end of the chunkey field. A large number of male graves, 314 of 316, were found buried under it.

The houses in the village were laid out in a very orderly fashion, located on the same axis as the mounds at the site, demonstrating that the whole site was planned. Members of the de Soto Entrada described the villages of the Pacaha and Nodena peoples as being the most carefully planned and organized of all the villages they had seen in "La Florida", which was what they called the entire southeast. The villages of this area were described as having few if any trees, probably because this was the primary source of fuel and building materials. Many trees close to the villages would have been cut down for these purposes. Homes were built from wattle and daub, with thatched roofs. The palisade which surrounded the site was designed for defensive purposes. It had bastions at regular intervals, with archer slots to defend against enemy attacks. The peoples of Casqui and Pacaha were in a state of perpetual war with one another, and most large sites throughout the area in this time period had this type of defensive palisade.

The de Soto chroniclers indicate that political provinces characterized by a paramount chief living in a paramount town with satellite vassal towns surrounding it were the major political institutions of this area. The Nodena site was either the main town or one of the larger satellite towns of the Pacaha province.

Pottery

Most pottery found at the Nodena site is of the kind known as Mississippian Bell Plain. It was buff colored, contains large fragments of ground mussel shell as a tempering agent, and isn't as smooth and polished as other varieties. Other kinds found there are much finer, with a finer ground shell as a temper, some instances being so finely ground as to look untempered. The Nodena phase people put a bowl and a bottle into a grave with the bodies, usually of the finer variety of pottery. Shapes and decoration were varied in the mortuary pottery, from brightly colored abstract spiral designs, to elaborate effigy vessels depicting human heads, animals, and hunters and their prey. Pottery made by the Nodena people was built up from strips of clay, and then smoothed out by the potter, much like other pottery in the Eastern America area where the potters wheel was unknown. Slips using galena for white, hematite for red, and sometimes graphite for black were used to paint the pottery, with a red on white swastika design being particularly popular. Sometimes incising was used (an example is the incised raptor image on the effigy head pot pictured), although it is rare in Nodena pottery.

Head deformation

The people of the Nodena phase practiced artificial cranial deformation or head flattening. Shortly after infants were born, they were strapped to a special carrier which deformed their skulls as they grew. Many of the skeletal remains found at the Nodena site had deformed skulls, of the type defined as fronto-occipital deformation, flattening of the forehead and the back of the head. Of 123 skulls found by Dr. Hampson, only six could be considered "normal", meaning they did not show the signs of head deformation. The functioning of the brain is not affected by cranial deformation, but the overall shape of the skull bones are. This practice was performed by many Native American tribes into historic times, including the Choctaw, although it later fell out of favor.

Agriculture and food
The people of Nodena were intensely involved in maize agriculture, as well as other food crops originating in the Americas, such as beans, squash, sunflowers and gourds. They also gathered wild foodstuffs such as pecans and persimmons. The de Soto chroniclers described the area as being under heavy cultivation, and the most populous they had seen in La Florida. The Spaniards described groves of  wild fruit and nut bearing trees, implying that the Nodena must have left them standing when clearing other trees for the cultivation of maize. The hunting of whitetail deer, squirrel, rabbit, turkey, and mallard was practiced as well as fishing for alligator gar, catfish, drum, and mussels.

Language
The peoples of Nodena were probably Tunican or Siouan speaking. It is known that the Tunica were in the area at the time of the de Soto Entrada, and the related group of phases present in the region may have all been Tunican speakers, with Caddoan speakers to their west and south. But by the time of later European contact in the 1670s and the beginning of the historic period, the area was occupied by the Dhegiha Siouan speaking Quapaw. Attempts have been made to connect pottery styles and words from the de Soto narratives with historic tribes, but have so far been unsuccessful.

Dr. James K. Hampson
The museum for the Nodena site is named after Dr. James K. Hampson (1877–1956), owner of the Hampson Plantation on which the Nodena site is located, and the first archaeologist to excavate and preserve the artifacts from the Nodena site and to document their recovery.
The Hampson Museum State Park in Wilson, Arkansas exhibits an archeological collection of early American aboriginal artifacts from the Nodena site. Cultivation of crops, hunting, social life, religion and politics of that ancient civilization are topics of the exhibition. Stone and shell artifacts as well as pottery are on display to illustrate the culture of the Nodena people.

Prehistoric Mastodon skeleton

Mastodons are members of the prehistoric, extinct genus Mammut, they resemble modern elephants. Native to North America they are said to have lived on the North American continent from almost 4 million years ago until their eventual disappearance about 10,000 years ago. In 1957 the site was reported as destroyed.

See also
 Eaker site
 Mississippian culture
 Southeastern Ceremonial Complex
 List of Mississippian sites
 List of sites and peoples visited by the Hernando de Soto Expedition
 List of burial mounds in the United States

References

External links

 Animation: Towns and Temples of the Mississippian Culture-5 Sites
 Photographs of stone and shell artifacts and of pottery from the Nodena site
 Hampson 3D Virtual Museum - View and Interact with hundreds of 3D Nodena artifacts from the Hampson Museum
 Parkin and Nodena Phase

Archaeological type sites
Mounds in Arkansas
Nodena Phase
Native American history of Arkansas
National Historic Landmarks in Arkansas
Pre-historic cities in the United States
Former populated places in Arkansas
Geography of Mississippi County, Arkansas
Archaeological sites on the National Register of Historic Places in Arkansas
National Register of Historic Places in Mississippi County, Arkansas
Populated places on the National Register of Historic Places in Arkansas